Rhino Bucket is the debut album by the American hard rock band Rhino Bucket, released in 1990. The album contained a Parental Advisory sticker, which the band, in print on the cover, objected to. The band supported the album with a North American tour.

Critical reception

The Vancouver Sun wrote that "lead guitarist Greg Fields has the meanest, meatiest riffs this side of Angus Young." The St. Louis Post-Dispatch concluded: "You have to hand it to Rhino Bucket. They own every AC/DC album, and they've obviously never listened to anything else." The Toronto Sun called the album "full of chugging riffs, screaming vocals, half-sung/half-chanted choruses, and song titles that are little more than thinly disguised ways of saying the same thing."

Track listing
"One Night Stand" - 4:04
"Beg For Your Love" - 4:32
"Train Ride" - 4:16
"Going Down Tonight" - 4:04
"Even the Sun Goes Down" - 3:59
"Blood On The Cross" - 3:54
"Shot Down" - 4:26
"I'd Rather Go Insane" - 3:25
"Inside/Outside" - 3:39
"Ride the Rhino" - 2:54

Personnel
Georg Dolivo: lead vocals, rhythm guitar
Greg Fields: lead guitar
Reeve Downes: bass, backing vocals
Liam Jason: drums

References

Rhino Bucket albums
1990 albums
Reprise Records albums